Chanda Nagar is a suburb of Hyderabad and is located close to Lingampally and Miyapur. It is administered as Ward No. 110 of Greater Hyderabad Municipal Corporation.

It has a mixture of commercial and residential properties with shopping malls and housing colonies.

It has undergone a drastic change in recent years especially due to its proximity to major IT companies like CA, Microsoft, Wipro, TCS, Infosys, Capgemini, Polaris, CMC, Honeywell, CTS and Infotech, and Hi-Tech city. Many IT professionals choose to stay at Chandanagar for the all-around facilities provided and the peaceful environment.  Major educational institutes such as Indian School of Business (ISB), International Institute of Information Technology (IIIT), and Hyderabad Central University are within 10  km and it is also the nearest major suburb to the newly established Indian Institute of Technology (IIT).

The area has become a multi-community living area. In the recent GHMC elections, Mrs. Manjula Raghunath Reddy won the corporate seat.

Commercial area
There are many shopping malls and supermarkets located in this area.

Large malls (Clothing) like Chennai Shopping Mall, RS Brothers, KLM Fashion Mall, and leading brand stores like Reebok, Adidas, BATA, Raymonds, Peter England, Pepe, Otto, etc., are part of this area. 
Among many supermarkets, Vijetha, Ratnadeep, and Heritage are the most famous. Big Bazaar is also planning an outlet just opposite Chennai Shopping Mall; the work is already underway. Furniture stores such as Anu Furniture, RNR's Furniture Square, Damro, and Visree Traders Furniture Store are present from the inception.
Leading Electronic Stores like Bajaj Electronics, TATA Croma, YES Mart, and Reliance Digital are in this area.
Healthcare places like - Apollo Clinic, Vishnu's Paramitha Children and Women Hospital, and American Laser Eye Hospital  Pranam Hospital are also situated in this area.

Bigbazar is under renovation to Chandanagar.

Sridevi theatre, Srilatha Theatre, Asian Jyothi Theatre, Inox (GSM Mall), Miraj (Geeta Cinemas), and the upcoming JP Cinemas (Tapadia's Maruti Infinity Mall) are surrounded by Chandanagar with 19 screens. (adding JP Cinemas)

Chandanagar also has many educational institutions like Sri Chaitanya Jr. college, Narayana Jr. college, etc., and schools like Bhavans, and Sancta Maria in the vicinity. Mytri super specialty hospital and Tesla diagnostics are located here with many other clinics and general hospitals.

Gangaram Hanuman temple and Venkateshwara Swamy temple are the most prominent temples in the area. Hyderabad St. Thomas Marthoma Church is also located in Chandanagar.

Public transport
The state-owned TSRTC runs the city bus service, connecting Chandanagar to all the major centers of the city and IT Parks.  
Chandanagar is on the Hyderabad-Mumbai NH road which was widened to six lanes

It is serviced by Hyderabad's local train MMTS Train service.

The proposed road from Myhome Jewel on NH65 to Navayuga SEZ on Old Mumbai road as per the master plan may be laid as early as possible.

IT/ITES Park (SEZ)
The Ameenpur area in Chandanagar is declared as Special Economic Zone. Phoenix Living Spaces Pvt Ltd has initiated plans in setting up the infrastructure.

Nearby Areas
Multiple major areas of Hyderabad and Secunderabad are in close range of Chandanagar.
Jubilee Hills                        - 12.1km
Banjara Hills                        - 17.1km
Gachibowli                           - 8.3km
Madhapur                             - 9.2km
Kukatpally Village                   - 7.0km
Kukatpally Housing Board Colony(KPHB)- 4.9km
Raidurg                              - 9.0km
Narsingi                             - 15.0km
Nallagandla                          - 7.7km
Ameerpet                             - 12.9km
Secunderabad                         - 18.1km
Golconda                             - 16.6km
Charminar Zone                       - 24.0km
Punjagutta                           - 14.5km               
Manikonda Jagir                      - 13.9km
Somajiguda                           - 15.2km
A.S Rao Nagar                        - 24.1km
Lingampally                          - 6.0km
Miyapur                              - 3.7km
Hafeezpet                            - 2.8km
Madinaguda                           - 2.5km
Patancheru                           - 11.6km
Ramachandrapuram(BHEL Township)      - 9.3km
Ameeenpur Village                    - 7.7km
Beeramguda Village                   - 9.1km
Rajendranagar                        - 24.8km
Kokapet                              - 15.6km
Dundigal                             - 21.7km
Jeedimetla                           - 13.6km
Alwal                                - 21.1km
Old Alwal                            - 22.6km
Amberpet                             - 23.6km
Chaitanyapuri                        - 27.8km
L.B.Nagar                            - 34.9km
S.R.Nagar                            - 12.1km
Himayathnagar                        - 19.2km
Chanchalguda                         - 23.5km
Shamshabad                           - 32.9km
Chilakalaguda                        - 21.0km

References

Distances are calculated using Google Maps as of Mar 5, 2023.

Cities and towns in Ranga Reddy district